Andorra Telecom is the only operator of fixed telephony, mobile telephony, subscription television and internet in the Principality of Andorra, constituting a monopoly in the field of telecommunications in the principality. It is a public company and is owned by the Government of Andorra.

It is also the company in charge of managing the technical infrastructures of digital terrestrial television broadcasting in Andorra, in charge of taking both the national television channels and some Spanish and French DTT channels to the whole territory. It also has an agreement with the Spanish company Telefónica to offer the Spanish pay channel platform Movistar Plus+ in Andorra.

In October 2018, it had 38,464 fixed telephone lines contracted, 81,697 mobile telephone lines and 34,624 Internet lines, all of them through FTTH, being a pioneer country in which all citizens have access to the Internet through optical fiber.

The company is managed by a board of directors with responsibility before the General Council of Andorra for the management, direction and representation of the service, and the administration and disposal of its assets and resources.

Services
It broadcasts through an agreement between other television channels:
All the channels broadcast nationally in Spain by the Movistar Plus+ platform (family package).
All the channels broadcast by the Movistar Plus+ platform (family package) at a regional level in Catalonia.
All the channels broadcast on DTT in Andorra.

References

External links

  

Communications in Andorra
Companies of Andorra
Telecommunications companies established in 1975